Triveni Rural Municipality may refer to:

Triveni Rural Municipality, Rolpa
Triveni Rural Municipality, Salyan
Triveni Rural Municipality, Western Rukum

See also
Sanni Triveni Rural Municipality
Triveni (disambiguation)
Tribeni (disambiguation)